Francisco Gomez (born January 8, 1987), known professionally as Frank Ray, is an American country music singer. Signed to BBR Music Group, he has released the single "Country'd Look Good on You".

Biography
Francisco Gomez is a native of Deming, New Mexico. His parents divorced when he was four years old, and he lived with his mother in Laredo and San Antonio, Texas. He then moved to Columbus, New Mexico with his father. It was through his moving that he began listening to not only country music, but also ranchera music. As he is of Hispanic descent, he thought that he would "stand out" as a country musician, citing other Hispanic artists such as Freddy Fender as inspiration on this front.

From 2007 to 2017, Gomez worked as a police officer in Las Cruces, New Mexico. After having success with performances on weekends and gaining regional commercial success with songs on the Texas country charts, he retired from the police force and began singing full-time. He released an EP titled Different Kind of Country in 2018 under his performing name of Frank Ray. In addition, he became an opening act for Ashley McBryde.

In 2021, Ray signed with BBR Music Group and released his debut single "Streetlights". The song features Ray singing in both English and Spanish. Ray was contacted by BBR staff after one of them discovered a previous song of his, "Tequila Mockingbird", on a Spotify playlist. Later in the year he issued another single, "Country'd Look Good on You". This was followed in January 2022 by his first performance on the Grand Ole Opry.

The same month, "Country'd Look Good on You" entered the top 40 on the Billboard Country Airplay charts.

Discography

Singles

References

American male singers
American country singers
BBR Music Group artists
Living people
People from Luna County, New Mexico
1987 births